John Lee Erwin (born December 5, 1936) is an American voice actor best known for voicing He-Man and Morris the Cat.

Career
Erwin was the voice of He-Man in the Filmation productions He-Man and the Masters of the Universe and She-Ra: Princess of Power that ran from 1983 to 1986. Due to the extreme cost-cutting by Filmation, the cast of voice actors was small, and producer Lou Scheimer actually performed the bulk of the character voices. Erwin was also the voice of the henchman character Beast Man, and would on occasion do the voices of other supporting characters, too, such as Webstor and Ram Man.

Although generally recognized for his work on He-Man, Erwin has many years of voice acting to his credit (including the voice of Reggie Mantle in Filmation's Archie cartoon), and has provided voices for many productions ranging from television advertisements to live-action movies since the 1960s. He was the voice of Morris the Cat in several television commercials.

From 1959 to 1965, he starred as Teddy in the television Western Rawhide.

In 1989, his voice was heard as a radio newscaster in Back to the Future Part II and as a football announcer in the 2000 Disney movie Remember the Titans.

He also did small spot roles in various Hanna-Barbera episodes for different shows (such as Hanna-Barbera's animated series The Thing) and others, going uncredited.

Personal life
Erwin had moved away from California by 2010, although in 2014 Alan Oppenheimer stated he had recently visited Erwin in his retirement community in Thousand Oaks, California.

Filmography
13 Fighting Men (1960) ... Cpl. McLean
Aesop's Fables (1971) ... Donkey/Fox (voice)
Looker (1981) ... Commercial Announcer (voice)
Back to the Future Part II (1989) ... Radio Sportscaster (voice)
Babe (1995) ... TV Commentator (voice)

References

External links

1936 births
American male television actors
American male voice actors
Filmation people
Hanna-Barbera people
Living people
Place of birth missing (living people)